Every Time I Breathe is a song recorded by Big Daddy Weave. It was released as a single from the band's 2006 album of the same title.

Charts 
Weekly

Decade-end

References 

2007 singles
2006 songs
Big Daddy Weave songs